Cordillera is an unincorporated community + metro district in Eagle County, Colorado, United States. The U.S. Post Office at Edwards (ZIP Code 81632) serves Cordillera postal addresses but the township has its own post office as well. There are approximately 900 homesites in Cordillera, which is divided into several neighborhoods: Summit, Ranch and the Divide. Each neighborhood has its own distinct feel and look but is part of the overall tight-knit community. Amenities offered to residents include a private equestrian center and Bearcat Stables for trail rides, miles of hiking and biking trails, outdoor pool, fitness facility with indoor pool and workout classes, private ski club, skier shuttle, Nordic track, three golf courses, a private section for fly fishing on the Eagle River, five stocked ponds, outdoor ice skating rink and summer day camp for children. This gated community also provides 24-hour public safety, trail and street maintenance, RV storage as well as community operations. (408 Carterville Road, Cordillera, Colorado 81632)

Geography
Cordillera is located at  (39.642545,-106.644824).

See also
 List of cities and towns in Colorado
 Edwards Micropolitan Statistical Area

References

External links
 http://cordilleraliving.com

Unincorporated communities in Eagle County, Colorado
Unincorporated communities in Colorado